The 2002 Singapore Open (officially known as the Yonex-Sunrise Singapore Open 2002 for sponsorship reasons) was a five-star badminton tournament that took place at the Singapore Indoor Stadium in Singapore, from August 19 to August 25, 2002. The total prize money on offer was US$170,000.

Venue
Singapore Indoor Stadium

Prize money distributions
Below is the prize money distributions for each round (all in USD$). In doubles it is referred as the prize money per pair:

Final results

References

Singapore Open (badminton)
Singapore
2002 in Singaporean sport